Holiday for Swing is the second studio album and first Christmas album by American actor and singer Seth MacFarlane, released by Republic Records on September 30, 2014. It is available on CD, vinyl and as a digital download. The album is a collection of Christmas songs and contains collaborations with artists including Norah Jones and Sara Bareilles. It also features Frank Sinatra's bassist Chuck Berghofer as well as a 65-piece orchestra. The album is the follow-up to MacFarlane's Grammy-nominated 2011 debut album Music Is Better Than Words. Like Music Is Better Than Words, Holiday for Swing was produced and conducted by film and television composer Joel McNeely.

Background and recording
On May 15, 2014, it was announced that MacFarlane had completed his first Christmas album and that it would be released in time for the 2014 holiday season.

The album was recorded between Christmas Day and New Year's Eve 2013 in Los Angeles and in studio 2 at Abbey Road Studios in London. In an interview with Billboard, MacFarlane explained why the album was recorded during the holidays nearly one year before its release:
"Generally with a holiday album, you find yourself making the recordings during the summer or any time but Christmas, with this one we actually lucked out. Part of it was because we didn't want to bump up against the production schedule for Ted 2, which is not an ideal time to be recording anything with 12 to 15 hour days shooting a movie. It worked out nicely, and it was just a pure joy to do."

Release
Holiday for Swing was released on September 30, 2014, through Republic Records.

Critical reception

Holiday for Swing received mostly positive reviews from music critics upon its release.

Stephen Thomas Erlewine of AllMusic rated the album three stars out of five and states: "Apart from the ever so slight notion that he's singing with a wink borrowed from Burl Ives -- a tell that gives away his status as a Gen-Xer weaned on Rankin & Bass holiday productions -- MacFarlane plays it straight, even when he's camping it up with Sara Bareilles on "Baby, It's Cold Outside" (Norah Jones is the other guest, singing on "Little Jack Frost Get Lost"), and this sincerity plays out in his favor."

Track listing

Personnel
Credits adapted from AllMusic:

Production

Joel McNeely — arranger, conductor, liner notes, producer
Jonathan Allen — engineer
Rich Breen — Engineer, mixing
Joy Fehily — executive producer
Mark Graham — music preparation
Isobel Griffiths — contracting
Dave Hage — librarian
JoAnn Kane — music preparation
Bob Ludwig — mastering
Matthew Peak — illustrations

Additional musicians

Jennifer Barnes — vocals (background)
Dan Bates — cor anglais, oboe
Chuck Berghofer — bass
Mark Berrow — violin
Richard Berry — French horn
Ishani Bhoola — violin
Dave Bishop — B-flat clarinet, flute, flute (alto), sax (tenor)
Richard Bissill — French horn
Nigel Black — French horn
Graeme Blevins — B-flat clarinet, flute, flute (alto), sax (alto), sax (soprano)
John Bradbury — violin
Gordon Campbell — trombone (tenor)
Emil Chakalov — violin
Reiad Chibah — viola
Chris Cowie — cor anglais, oboe
Dave Daniels — celli
Tim Davis — vocal contractor, vocals (background)
Caroline Dearnley — celli
Alison Dods — violin
Phillip Eastop — French horn
Dai Emanuel — violin
Peter Erskine — drums
Andrew Gathercole — flugelhorn, trumpet
Richard George — violin
Tim Gill — celli
Adam Goldsmith — guitar (acoustic)
Missi Hale — vocals (background)
David Hartley — celeste, piano
Andrew Haveron — leader, violin
John Heley — celli
Ian Humphries — violin
Magnus Johnston — leader, violin
Karen Jones — flute
Skaila Kanga — harp
Patrick Kiernan — violin
Liam Kirkman — trombone (tenor)
Julia Knight — viola
Teri Eiko Koide — vocals (background)
Boguslaw Kostecki — violin
David Loucks — vocals (background)
Mike Lovatt — flugelhorn, trumpet
Jim Lynch — flugelhorn, trumpet
Seth MacFarlane — liner notes
Rita Manning — violin
Danny Marsden — flugelhorn, trumpet
Eliza Marshall — flute
Howard McGill — B-flat clarinet, flute, flute (alto), sax (tenor)
Steve Morris — violin
Nick Moss — B-flat clarinet, flute, flute (alto), sax (tenor)
Kate Musker — viola
Everton Nelson — leader, violin
Mark Nightingale — trombone (tenor)
Andy Panayi — B-flat clarinet, flute, flute (alto), sax (alto), sax (soprano)
John Parricelli — guitar (acoustic)
Alan Pasqua — piano
Camilla Pay — harp
David Pyatt — French horn
Frank Ricotti — percussion
Tom Rizzo — guitar (acoustic)
Martin Robertson — B-flat clarinet, clarinet (bass), flute, sax (baritone)
Jackie Shave — leader, violin
Emlyn Singleton — violin
Colin Skinner — B-flat clarinet, clarinet (bass), flute, sax (baritone)
Sonia Slany — violin
Jamie Talbot — B-flat clarinet, flute, flute (alto), sax (alto), sax (soprano)
Cathy Thompson — violin
Phil Todd — B-flat clarinet, flute, flute (alto), sax (alto), sax (soprano)
Chris Tombling — violin
Bozidar Vukotic — celli
Vicci Wardman — viola
Richard Watkins — French horn
Bruce White — viola
Pat White — flugelhorn, trumpet
Rolf Wilson — violin
Andy Wood — trombone (bass)

Chart performance

Release history

References

2014 Christmas albums
Albums produced by Joel McNeely
Christmas albums by American artists
Covers albums
Pop Christmas albums
Republic Records albums
Seth MacFarlane albums
Swing Christmas albums